Nottingham City Council is the local authority for the unitary authority of Nottingham in Nottinghamshire, England. It consists of 55 councillors, representing a total of 20 wards, elected every four years. The council is led by David Mellen, of the majority Labour Party. The most recent elections were held on Thursday 2 May 2019.

History
Nottingham was an ancient borough. It was reformed under the Municipal Corporations Act 1835 to become a municipal borough, and when county councils were established in 1889 the town was administered separately from the rest of Nottinghamshire, being made its own county borough. When Nottingham was awarded city status in 1897 the borough council was allowed to call itself Nottingham City Council. In 1974 Nottingham became a non-metropolitan district under the Local Government Act 1972, becoming a lower tier authority with Nottinghamshire County Council providing county level services in the city for the first time. The city was made a unitary authority on 1 April 1998, regaining its independence from the county council.

Political control

The most recent election was in 2019, when Labour took a large majority on the council, winning 50 of the council's 55 seats. David Mellen was appointed leader of the council on 20 May 2019. The next election is due in 2023.

Wards

Nottingham is divided into 20 wards for electoral purposes. Each ward elects either two or three councillors.

Arms

References

Notes

External links
 Nottingham City Council
 Ward info

Nottingham
Unitary authority councils of England
Local education authorities in England
Billing authorities in England
Leader and cabinet executives
Local authorities in Nottinghamshire